Hamed Hamadan Al-Bishi (born 3 March 1982) is a Saudi Arabian track and field athlete who specialises in sprint running. He won a gold medal in 4 x 400 m relay at the 2002 Asian Games and became Asian champion over 200 metres in 2005. He also competed in the men's 4 × 400 metres relay at the 2000 Summer Olympics.

Achievements

References

External links

1982 births
Living people
Saudi Arabian male sprinters
Place of birth missing (living people)
Asian Games medalists in athletics (track and field)
Athletes (track and field) at the 2002 Asian Games
Athletes (track and field) at the 2006 Asian Games
Athletes (track and field) at the 2010 Asian Games
Athletes (track and field) at the 2000 Summer Olympics
Olympic athletes of Saudi Arabia
Asian Games gold medalists for Saudi Arabia
Medalists at the 2002 Asian Games
Medalists at the 2006 Asian Games
Medalists at the 2010 Asian Games
Islamic Solidarity Games competitors for Saudi Arabia
Islamic Solidarity Games medalists in athletics
21st-century Saudi Arabian people